The 1991 Michigan State Spartans football team competed on behalf of Michigan State University as a member of the Big Ten Conference during the 1991 NCAA Division I-A football season. Led by ninth-year head caochGeorge Perles, the Spartans compiled an overall record of 3–8 overall with a mark of 3–5 in conference play, tying for sixth place in the Big Ten. Michigan State played home games at Spartan Stadium in East Lansing, Michigan.

Schedule

Roster

1992 NFL Draft
The following players were selected in the 1992 NFL Draft.

References

Michigan State
Michigan State Spartans football seasons
Michigan State Spartans football